Raymond Burke, O.F.M. (died 28 July 1562) was an Irish Roman Catholic and Anglican priest who was Bishop of Emly (1550–62).

Career 
Burke was a member of the Order of Friars Minor and was appointed Bishop of Emly by the Holy See on 20 October 1550, recognised by the crown in the reign of Queen Mary I, later described as an 'adherent of Queen Elizabeth' and died in office on 28 July 1562.

References

Bishops of Emly
1562 deaths
House of Burgh
Year of birth unknown
16th-century Roman Catholic bishops in Ireland